Tenax was an Irish UCI Professional Continental cycling team active from 1994 to 2007. The team merged with Team LPR in 2008.

References

Defunct cycling teams based in Italy
Defunct cycling teams based in Ireland
Cycling teams established in 2003
Cycling teams disestablished in 2007
Former UCI Professional Continental teams